is a volcanic group of stratovolcanoes and lava domes located in Nagano Prefecture on Honshū in Japan.

Description
The Northern Yatsugatake Volcanic Group is part of the Yatsugatake Mountains. The northern group is defined as the mountains from Mount Futago to Natsuzawa Pass. The highest peak of the mountains is Mount Tengu and the elevation is 2,646 metres.

The southern Yatsugatake mountains are steep and have alpine characteristics. The mountains of the Northern Yatsugatake Volcanic Group are gentler and lower.

Yatsugatake is listed among the 100 famous mountains in Japan, but this refers to the Southern Yatsugatake Volcanic Group. Mount Tateshina is also mentioned as one of the 100 famous mountains, and it is part of the Northern Yatsugatake mountains, but is listed separately.

These mountains are part of the Yatsugatake-Chūshin Kōgen Quasi-National Park.

Geology and volcanic activity
The volcanoes are stratovolcanos that are 1 million to 200,000 years old. The rock is mainly basalt, dacite, and andesite. Mount Yoko has shown the most recent activity and is now considered an active volcano. It last erupted about 800 years ago. In 888 a debris avalanche on the East side of the volcanic massif caused Lake Matsubara to form. The Tateshina-kogen plateau was formed by a large lava flow.

List of peaks
The following peaks, from North to South, make up the Northern Yatsugatake Volcanic Group:
 Mount Futago, cinder cone
 Mount Tateshina (Also known as Suwa Fuji), stratovolcano
 Mount Yoko (Also known at Mount Kita Yoko.), lava dome
 Mount Shimagare, lava dome
 Mount Chausu, lava dome
 Mount Maru
 Nyu
 Mount Naka
 Mount Tengu
 Mount Neishi

See also
List of volcanoes in Japan
List of mountains in Japan

References
 Welcome to Yatsugatake
 Official Home Page of the Geographical Survey Institute in Japan

Gallery

Volcanoes of Yamanashi Prefecture
Volcanoes of Nagano Prefecture
Volcanoes of Honshū
Volcanic groups
Complex volcanoes